The Western Theater Command Ground Force is the ground force under the Western Theater Command. Its headquarters is in Lanzhou, Gansu. The current political commissar is Xu Deqing.

History 
The Western Theater Command Ground Force was officially established on 31 December 2015 with the troops of former Lanzhou Military Region and Chengdu Military Region.

Functional department 
 General Staff
 Political Work Department
 Logistics Department
 Equipment department
 Disciplinary Inspection Committee

Direct units 
 Qingtongxia Joint Tactic Training Base

Direct troops

Group army 
 76th Group Army (stations in Xining, Qinghai)
 77th Group Army (stations in Chongzhou, Sichuan)

Other army 
 Third Brigade of Reconnaissance Intelligence
 Third Brigade of Information Support
 Third Brigade of Electronic Warfare
 53rd_Mountain_Motorized_Infantry_Brigade_(People's_Republic_of_China)
 54th Brigade, Tibet Military District

List of leaders

Commanders

Political commissars

Chief of staffs

References 

Western Theater Command
Chengdu Military Region
Lanzhou Military Region
Military units and formations established in 2015
2015 establishments in China